Podangis is a genus of flowering plants from the orchid family, Orchidaceae.

There are two known species, native to tropical western and central Africa ranging from Senegal to Tanzania to Angola.

Podangis dactyloceras (Rchb.f.) Schltr. (1918) - from Sierra Leone to Tanzania to Angola
Podangis rhipsalisocia (Rchb.f.) P.J.Cribb & Carlsward, (2012) - from Senegal to Central African Republic to Angola

References

 Berg Pana, H. 2005. Handbuch der Orchideen-Namen. Dictionary of Orchid Names. Dizionario dei nomi delle orchidee. Ulmer, Stuttgart
 Burkill, H.M. (1985). The useful plants of west tropical Africa, Vol. 4.

External links
 
 

 
Orchids of Africa
Vandeae genera